Coles Creek State Park is a  state park located on the Saint Lawrence River on the west bank of Coles Creek. The park is in the Town of Waddington in St. Lawrence County, New York.

Park description
Coles Creek State Park offers a beach, picnic tables with pavilions, a nature trail, recreation programs, seasonal waterfowl and deer hunting, fishing and ice fishing, a marina and boat launch with dockage and boat rentals, and a food concession. The park also includes a campground with 232 tent and trailer sites, 147 of which include electric hookups.

See also
 List of New York state parks

References

External links
 New York State Parks: Coles Creek State Park

State parks of New York (state)
Parks in St. Lawrence County, New York